Thomas Whittemore (January 1, 1800 – March 21, 1861 in Cambridge, Massachusetts) was a Christian Universalist author, speaker and influential member of the Universalist Church of America. He founded and was the editor of The Trumpet and Universalist magazine, which succeeded the Universalist magazine of Hosea Ballou in 1828.

Like Ballou and Ballou's grand-nephew, Hosea Ballou II, first president of Tufts College, Whittemore contributed to Universalist historiography by identifying precedents for Universalist beliefs in earlier Christianity. With Thomas J. Sawyer of New York, he co-founded  the Universalist Historical Society in 1834. These histories were influential in bringing many readers to regard the Christians of the first centuries as Universalists.

Massachusetts Legislature
From 1831 to 1836, Whittemore served as Cambridge's representative in the Massachusetts legislature, serving as chair of the committee that oversaw the disestablishment of the Congregational Church and Unitarian Church, to whose special status Whittemore was opposed, from the privileged position they had been accorded in the Massachusetts Constitution. Whittmore held that "no civil government has a right to compel the citizens to support any system of religion whatsoever" and supported calls for a popular referendum on the separation of church and state in 1834. The results of that referendum brought Massachusetts into accord with the First Amendment to the United States Constitution.

He was buried in Mount Auburn Cemetery.

His papers are in the Harvard Divinity School Library at Harvard Divinity School in Cambridge, Massachusetts; the Thomas Whittemore family papers are at Tufts University's Digital Collections and Archives.

Ideas 

"The glory of God, and of His Son Jesus Christ, as manifested in the final holiness and happiness of all men, is the central sun of Universalism."

-Thomas Whittemore, Plain Guide to Universalism

Works
 The Modern History of Universalism 1830, revised 1860 - a companion to Ballou's Ancient History of Universalism which covers 1500-1800
 The plain guide to Universalism: designed to lead inquirers to the belief of the doctrine, and believers to the practice of it 1840
 "Universalists Sustain the Bible", in The Trumpet and Universalist Magazine, August 19, 1848
 "Decision of the Vermont Convention" in The Trumpet and Universalist Magazine, September 23
 Life of Rev. Hosea Ballou, 1855
 The early days of Thomas Whittemore: An autobiography 1860
 A commentary on the Revelation of St. John, the Divine 1848

Notes

External links
 
 Plain Guide to Universalism book outlining his overview of what Universalism

1800 births
1861 deaths
Members of the Universalist Church of America
Politicians from Cambridge, Massachusetts
Members of the Massachusetts House of Representatives
19th-century Christian universalists
18th-century Christian universalists
19th-century American politicians
Christian universalism